NK Posavina was a Croatian football club based in the city of Zagreb. The former name of the club was NK Chromos. A new club is formed under the name NK Croatia '98

Football clubs in Croatia
Football clubs in Zagreb
Association football clubs established in 1955
1955 establishments in Croatia